Tom Stewart (born 11 January 2001) is a rugby union player from Northern Ireland, currently playing for United Rugby Championship and European Rugby Champions Cup side Ulster. He plays as a hooker.

Born in Belfast, Northern Ireland, Stewart attended Belfast Royal Academy and was named Ulster Schools Player of the Year in 2019, and captained Ulster at under 18 level. He joined the Ulster Rugby academy in June 2019. He was named in the Ireland squad for the 2020 Six Nations Under 20s Championship, starting in the wins against Scotland and Wales before the tournament was cancelled due to the COVID-19 pandemic. In January 2021 he signed a one-year development contract with Ulster, intended to be upgraded to a senior professional contract for the 2022–23 season. He was named in the senior squad for the 2021–22 season, and made his senior debut off the bench in an away defeat to Ospreys on 4 December 2021. He scored his first try in a 48-12 home victory against Cardiff on 4 March 2022. He was selected for the Emerging Ireland squad for the Toyota Challenge in South Africa in September 2022.

After scoring 7 tries in 11 appearances for Ulster in the 2022–23 season, he was called up to the Ireland squad for the 2023 Six Nations Championship, as cover for the injured Rónan Kelleher.

References

External links

Player Profile, Ulster Rugby
Player Profile, United Rugby Championship

2001 births
Living people
Rugby union players from Belfast
People educated at the Belfast Royal Academy
Irish rugby union players
Ulster Rugby players
Rugby union hookers